Setun River's Valley is the largest wildlife sanctuary within the Moscow bounds. The sanctuary territory is located along the course of the Setun River. The Setun River's flow is entirely within the Western Administrative Okrug of the city.

The fauna is represented by the least weasel, stoat, Eurasian water shrew, and muskrat.

It was founded in 1998.

References 

IUCN Category IV
Geography of Moscow